The Armagh County Board or Armagh GAA is one of the 32 county boards of the Gaelic Athletic Association (GAA) in Ireland, and is responsible for the administration of Gaelic games in County Armagh, Northern Ireland.

The county board is responsible for preparing the Armagh Gaa teams in the various  sporting codes; football, hurling, camogie and handball.

The county football team won an All-Ireland Senior Football Championship in 2002; it was the fifth from the province of Ulster to win the Sam Maguire Cup, leaving only Antrim, Fermanagh and Monaghan.

Football

Clubs
The county's most successful football club is Crossmaglen Rangers. Crossmaglen have won the Armagh Senior Football Championship on 45 occasions, the Ulster Senior Club Football Championship on 11 occasions, and All-Ireland Senior Club Football Championship on six occasions.

List of football clubs

County team

Armagh has a long tradition of football. Several clubs were already in existence before the formation of the County Board in 1889.

Armagh became only the second team to win the Ulster Senior Football Championship in 1890. In the early years of the GAA, a club that won its county championship went on to represent the county and would also wear the county colours. Armagh Harps represented Armagh in the Ulster final, beating Tyrone (Cookstown's Owen Roes), but losing to All-Ireland Champions Cork (Midleton) in the All-Ireland Semi-Final.

Despite early success at provincial level, national success at junior and minor level and All-Ireland final appearances in 1953 and 1977, it took until 2002 for the Armagh county team to win their first and only All-Ireland Senior Football Championship under manager Joe Kernan. The county won the All-Ireland Minor Football Championship, in 1949 and again in 2009, but lost the 1957 All-Ireland Minor final to Meath.

The current manager of the county football team (since 2015) is Kieran McGeeney, who had a five-year contract that was extended by a year in 2019 to 2020.

Hurling

County team

Like most counties outside of the game's heartland of Munster and south Leinster, hurling has tended to live in the shadow cast by Gaelic football in Armagh, with the exception of border areas such as Keady, Middletown and Armagh City.

Armagh won the 2010 Nicky Rackard Cup, defeating London by a scoreline of 3–15 to 3–14 at Croke Park on 3 July. The county's minor team won the Ulster Minor Hurling League Division One title and reached the final of the Ulster Minor Hurling Championship. The county's under-21 team also reached the final of the Ulster Under-21 Hurling Championship. In 2011, Armagh reached the Ulster Senior Hurling Championship final for the first time since 1946 and advanced to the Ulster Under-21 Hurling Championship final for a second consecutive year, the first time in team history. Armagh won the 2012 Nicky Rackard Cup, its second time to lift the trophy, defeating Louth by a scoreline of 3–20 to 1–15 at Croke Park on 9 June.

Camogie

The high point in Armagh's camogie history was an appearance in the National Camogie League final of 1995 against Cork, beating Galway and Wexford's first teams en route to the final. It came just one year after they qualified for senior status having won the All-Ireland Intermediate Camogie Championship in 1994, the "Premier Junior" championship for the Kay Mills Cup just twelve months earlier in 1993. The bulk of that team had emerged from an under-16 squad who reached the All Ireland final of 1988.

Armagh won Division 2 of the National Camogie League four times, 1980, 1988, 1993 and 1994, and the Nancy Murray Cup in 2006. Armagh qualified for the All Ireland Minor B final of 2003 and won the Minor C championship in 2011.

Crossmaglen won the 2005 All Ireland junior club title. Keady Lámh Dhearg qualified for the finals in 2006 and 2007. Keady Lámh Dhearg and St Brenda's Ballymacnab have won divisional honours at Féile na nGael. Notable players include young player of the year for 2005 Colette McSorley.

Under Camogie's National Development Plan 2010-2015, "Our Game, Our Passion", five new camogie clubs were to be established in the county by 2015.

The Armagh county camogie team sang a pro-IRA song in its dressing room after defeating Cavan in the 2020 All-Ireland Junior Camogie Championship final. Upper Bann MLA Jonathan Buckley said it was "inexcusable" and Councillor Sam Nicholson said it was sectarian. The county board vowed to investigate the incident. The county board later expressed regret for the incident. However, North Down Alliance MP Stephen Farry said the county board's statement did not go far enough.

Michael Murphy and Pauric Dowdall resigned as managers of the county camogie team; Mattie Lennon was appointed manager in March 2021.

Armagh have the following achievements in camogie.

 All-Ireland Intermediate Camogie Championship (1994)
 All-Ireland Junior Camogie Championship (1993)
 National Camogie League Division 2 (1980, 1988, 1993, 1994)
 Nancy Murray Cup (2006)
 Minor C championship (2011)

Ladies' football
Armagh has a ladies' football team.

References

External links

 Official website
 Armagh at Hogan Stand
 Titles won by Armagh teams
 Club championship winners
 The oldest living captain to lift the Anglo-Celt Cup - Dr Pat O'Neill - reflects

 
Gaelic games governing bodies in Northern Ireland
Gaelic games governing bodies in Ulster